The 2nd Nova Scotia general election may refer to:

Nova Scotia general election, 1759, the 2nd general election to take place in the Colony of Nova Scotia, for the 2nd General Assembly of Nova Scotia
1871 Nova Scotia general election, the 24th overall general election for Nova Scotia, for the (due to a counting error in 1859) 25th Legislative Assembly of Nova Scotia, but considered the 2nd general election for the Canadian province of Nova Scotia